The Petite Suite, L 65, is a suite for piano four hands by Claude Debussy. It has been transcribed many times, most notably in an orchestral version by Debussy's colleague Henri Büsser.

Background
The suite, which was composed from 1886 to 1889, was first performed on 2 February 1889 by Debussy and pianist-publisher Jacques Durand at a salon in Paris. It may have been written due to a request (possibly from Durand) for a piece that would be accessible to skilled amateurs, as its simplicity is in stark contrast with the modernist works that Debussy was writing at the time.

Structure

The work, which lasts about 13 minutes in performance, has four movements:
 (Sailing): Andantino
 (Retinue): Moderato
: Moderato
: Allegro giusto

The first two movements are settings of poems from the volume  by Paul Verlaine (1844–1896).

Transcriptions
The Petite Suite was orchestrated by Debussy's colleague Henri Büsser in 1907, and published by A. Durand & Fils. Büsser's transcription calls for two flutes (second doubling piccolo), two oboes (second doubling cor anglais), two clarinets, two bassoons, two horns, two trumpets, timpani, percussion (cymbals, tambourine and triangle), harp, and strings. The work has also been transcribed for clarinets, for harp, for brass band, and for chamber wind ensemble.

References

External links

, Anastasia (primo) and Liubov (secondo) Gromoglasova, piano

Suites by Claude Debussy
Compositions for piano four-hands
1889 compositions
Orchestral suites